The Ugly Duckling (Ugly Duckling in reissues) is an animated film from 1939 by Walt Disney, based on the 1843 fairy tale "The Ugly Duckling" by Hans Christian Andersen. The film was directed by Jack Cutting and Clyde Geronimi, and released in theaters on April 7, 1939. Music was composed by Albert Hay Malotte, who was uncredited for the film. The animated short was first distributed by RKO Radio Pictures.

An earlier Silly Symphony animated short based on this fairy tale had been produced in black and white in 1931. The 1939 color film won the 1940 Oscar for Best Short Subject (Cartoons), and also happened to be the last entry in the Silly Symphony series, although it was branded in certain releases as a special one-shot cartoon.

In the Andersen's tale, a cygnet is harassed because of his homeliness. To his delight, he matures into a swan, the most beautiful bird of all, and his troubles are over. In this version, the baby swan's sufferings are shortened, as he is found by his family, after only a few minutes of rejection and ostracism, instead of a whole year. This abbreviated version is read by Lilo to Stitch in the 2002 Disney film Lilo & Stitch. The story has a deep impact on Stitch, who sets out to look for his real family.

Plot
An expectant mallard duck father is pacing by his wife's side. Suddenly, the mother duck's eggs begin to hatch, much to the father's delight, giving birth to four little ducklings. But then, a fifth egg hatches, revealing a mismatched white duckling, and the father argues with the mother over this, forcing the two to go their separate ways after she slaps him (It is implied that the father is accusing the mother of having an affair with a swan.). The ugly duckling attempts to join the duck family, but they turn their backs on him, after which he discovers how different he is from them. So the duckling attempts to join a family of birds and even attempts to befriend a duck hunting decoy, but they all turn him down. The duckling feels sorry for himself and cries until a mother swan and her cygnets approach him. He joins this family and they accept him. The mother duck and her ducklings are surprised and realizes what he is and what he has the potential to become, they invites him to come back to them, but he refuses and proudly swims off with his new family.

Comic adaptation
The Silly Symphony Sunday comic strip ran a month-long adaptation of The Ugly Duckling from March 26 to April 16, 1939.

Reception
The Film Daily wrote, "The Hans Christian Andersen fairy tale translated to cartoon language emerges a delight to the ear and the eye... Though the story concerns only the feathered folk, this Disney short is fused with real feeling and pathos."

Home media
The short was released on December 4, 2001 on Walt Disney Treasures: Silly Symphonies - The Historic Musical Animated Classics.  It was included on the DVD release in the United States, Germany, France, Italy, Sweden, and the United Kingdom. It is also available on Disney+ with restored Silly Symphony title cards.

See also
 The Ugly Duckling (1931 film)
 Lambert the Sheepish Lion
 List of Disney animated shorts

References

External links

 The Ugly Duckling at The Encyclopedia of Disney Animated Shorts
 
 

1930s color films
1939 animated films
Silly Symphonies
RKO Pictures short films
1939 short films
Films based on The Ugly Duckling
Animated films about ducks
1930s Disney animated short films
Films directed by Clyde Geronimi
Films directed by Jack Cutting
Films produced by Walt Disney
Disney film remakes
Short film remakes
Animated films without speech
Best Animated Short Academy Award winners
RKO Pictures animated short films

fr:Le Vilain Petit Canard (1931)
es:El patito feo (La película 1939)